Sedláček (feminine Sedláčková) is a Czech surname, a diminutive of Sedlák which means a 'peasant farmer' or 'freeman farmer' who was relatively wealthy and owned his own land. Notable people with the surname include:

August Sedláček (1843–1926), Czech historian
Franz Sedlacek (1891, Breslau – 1945?), German-Austrian painter
Ján Sedláček, Slovak handballer
Jana Sedláčková, Czech footballer
Jaroslava Sedláčková, Czech gymnast
Josef Sedláček, Czech footballer
Kamil Sedláček, Czech linguist
Lumír Sedláček, Czech footballer
Marin Sedlaček, Serbian basketball coach
Michal Sedláček, Czech footballer
Pavel Sedláček (athlete), Czech Olympic hammer thrower
Pavel Sedláček (musician), Czech singer and guitarist
Richard Sedláček, Czech footballer
Roman Sedláček (born 1963), Czech footballer
Tomáš Sedláček (economist) (born 1977), Czech economist
Tomáš Sedláček (footballer) (born 1980), Czech football player
Tomáš Sedláček (general) (1918–2012), Czech general
Vojtěch Sedláček (born 1947), Czech entrepreneur
Woodrow Sedlacek, American racing horse trainer

Czech-language surnames
Occupational surnames